Jockey fields is an 18.05 hectare (44.5 acre) biological site of Special Scientific Interest at Walsall Wood, in the West Midlands. The site was notified in 1994 under the Wildlife and Countryside Act 1981 and is currently managed by the Country Trust.

The site notification details 38 plant species recorded at this SSI:

{{Gallery
|title=Plant species recorded at Jockey Fields SSI
|width=160
|height=165
|lines=4
|align=center
|File:Carex acutiformis.jpg|alt1=|Carex acutiformis, lesser pond sedge.
|File:Typha latifolia 02 bgiu.jpg|alt2=|Typha latifolia, common bullrush.
|File:Filipendula-ulmaria.JPG|alt3=|Filipendula ulmaria, meadowsweet.
|File:Lotus uliginosus.jpg|alt4=|Lotus pedunculatus, greater bird's foot trefoil.
|File:Iris pseudacorus 001.jpg|alt5=|Iris pseudacorus, yellow iris.
|File:Sumpfkratzdistel uf1-1-.jpg|alt6=|Cirsium palustre, marsh thistle
|File:Gestreepte witbol bloei Holcus lanatus.jpg|alt7=|Holcus lanatus, Yorkshire fog.
|File:Juncus effuses.jpg|alt8=|Juncus effusus, soft rush.
|File:Pinksterbloem.jpg|alt9=|Cardamine pratensis, cuckooflower.
|File:Mentha_aquatica_bluete.jpeg|alt10=|Mentha aquatica, water mint.
|File:No image placeholder.gif|alt11=|Stellaria alsine, bog stitchwort
|File:Galium palustre.jpeg|alt12=|Galium palustre, common marsh-bedstraw.
|File:Equisetum_palustre.jpeg|alt13=|Equisetum palustre, marsh horsetail.
}}

See also
List of Sites of Special Scientific Interest in the West Midlands

References
 Jockey fields English Nature''. Retrieved on 2008-05-26

Jockey fields
Sites of Special Scientific Interest in the West Midlands (county)